The Bridgestone Aso Open was a professional golf tournament that was held in Japan. It was an event on the Japan Golf Tour from 1978 to 1993. From 1983, it was played at the Aso Golf Club near Mount Aso in Kumamoto Prefecture.

Originally contested over 36 holes as the Aso National Park Open, the tournament was extended to 54 holes in 1981, and then 72 holes from 1982.

Tournament hosts

Winners

Notes

References

External links
Coverage on Japan Golf Tour's official site

Defunct golf tournaments in Japan
Former Japan Golf Tour events
Recurring sporting events established in 1977
Recurring sporting events disestablished in 1993
1976 establishments in Japan
1993 disestablishments in Japan